Made for Each Other is a 2009 romantic comedy, which received a limited theatrical release in 2009 before a DVD release in 2010.

Plot
Dan (Christopher Masterson) has a problem; he has been married to the beautiful Marcie (Bijou Phillips) for three months, but they still have not consummated their union. When Dan's sex-crazed boss Catherine (Lauren German) comes on to him during a marathon work session, he crumbles under temptation. Immediately regretting his actions but unable to simply admit his indiscretion, Dan schemes with his best pal Mike (Samm Levine) to get Marcie to wander astray, too. If Dan is not the only one who cheated, he and Mike surmise, then Marcie can not be mad at him for doing so. But hatching the plan is one thing, and finding a guy who is willing to go along with his plan is an altogether different challenge. Later, as the plan finally starts to come together, Dan discovers the truth about why Marcie has yet to sleep with him, and comes to realize that they may actually be the perfect couple after all.

Cast
Danny Masterson as Morris
Patrick Warburton as Mack Mackenzie
Christopher Masterson as Dan
Bijou Phillips as Marcy
Samm Levine as Mike
George Segal as Mr. Jacobs
Lauren German as Catherine
Leslie Hendrix as Mrs. Jacobs
Kelsey Fowler as Enola
Kyle Howard as Ed
Adrian Martinez as Harry
Andrew van den Houten as Charlie

Production
This is the first film in which both of the Masterson brothers have featured.

The film's original score was composed by Ryan Shore.

References

External links

2009 romantic comedy films
2009 films
2000s English-language films
Films shot in Connecticut
American romantic comedy films
Films scored by Ryan Shore
2000s American films